Yob Wildlife Reserve is a protected area in the Northern Red Sea and Anseba regions of northern Eritrea. According to the Gazetta Eritrea, it was established on 16 March 1959 by the British, specifically to protect the significant populations of Nubian ibex in the area.

The reserve is overlooked by the Wildlife Conservation Department of the Eritrean Ministry of Agriculture. It covers an area of 265,800 hectares and its protection appears to have been reaffirmed on 1 January 1975.

References

Protected areas established in 1959
Wildlife reserves of Eritrea